Tola Rose (foaled 1937 in Kentucky) was an American Thoroughbred racehorse who won several stakes races in his career but is best remembered for easily defeating U.S. Triple Crown winner Whirlaway in the 1942 running of the Butler Memorial Handicap. Ridden by Warren Mehrtens in front of a record crowd at Empire City Race Track, Tola Rose won by four lengths and did it in track record time. A year earlier, Tola Rose had finished second in the 1941 Butler Memorial to Belair Stud's Foxbrough.

Tola Rose was owned by Arthur J. Sackett who had been appointed President and Chairman of Mason & Hanger‐Silas Mason Company, Inc. succeeding Silas B. Mason, a fellow horse racing enthusiast who owned and bred Thoroughbreds.

Tola Rose was race-conditioned by future U.S. Racing Hall of Fame trainer, Max Hirsch.

Pedigree

References

1937 racehorse births
Thoroughbred family 2-o
Racehorses bred in Kentucky
Racehorses trained in the United States
Horse racing track record setters